Katherine Zackary (born July 26, 1989) is an American rugby sevens player. She debuted for the United States in 2016 and for the sevens team in 2010. She won a silver medal at the 2015 Pan American Games as a member of the United States women's national rugby sevens team.

Zackary attended Salina South High School and Benedictine College where she initially played soccer. She attended college on a soccer scholarship and it was there that she saw rugby. She played rugby for the Benedictine Saints. In 2014 she quit her job working in a gym to train full-time with the women's Eagles sevens team.

Zackary currently plays for the Exeter Chiefs Women's team. Exeter compete in the Allianz Premier 15s, the top tier of women's professional rugby in England.

In 2022, she was named in the Eagles squad for the Pacific Four Series in New Zealand. She was named in the Eagles fifteens squad to the 2021 Rugby World Cup in New Zealand.

References

External links 
 Kate Zackary at USA Rugby
 
 

1989 births
Living people
United States international rugby sevens players
American female rugby sevens players
Female rugby sevens players
Rugby sevens players at the 2015 Pan American Games
Pan American Games silver medalists for the United States
Pan American Games medalists in rugby sevens
Medalists at the 2015 Pan American Games